"Born Not to Know" is a song performed by American contemporary R&B group Tony! Toni! Toné!, issued as the second single from their debut album, Who? The song peaked at #4 on the Billboard R&B chart in 1988.

Charts

References

External links
 
 

1987 songs
1988 singles
Song recordings produced by Foster & McElroy
Songs written by Thomas McElroy
Tony! Toni! Toné! songs
Wing Records singles
Songs written by Denzil Foster